Alberto Rodríguez Barrera (born 1 April 1974) is a Mexican former professional footballer who played as a defender. His last game was a 2012 Copa Libertadores match against Paraguayan side Libertad after being called from Cruz Azul Hidalgo along with 2002 World Cup teammate Melvin Brown under petition of Cruz Azul's coach then, Enrique Meza, who also coached him at Pachuca. After not playing at Cruz Azul Hidalgo since then, he was cut from the squad, leading Rodríguez to announce his retirement.

He has been capped for the Selección de fútbol de México (Mexico national team) and he was an unused substitute at the 2002 FIFA World Cup.

He started his career with the UNAM Pumas, but he moved to the Pachuca Tuzos in 1994. After a short period when he moved to Monterrey, he came back to Pachuca to become the captain of the team and lift 3 National cups, and one CONCACAF Champions Cup.

His last goal was scored in the 2005 Copa Libertadores against Boca Juniors in Hidalgo Stadium.

Clubs
 1992–1994: UNAM Pumas
 1994–1997: C.F. Pachuca
 1997–1998: CF Monterrey
 1998–2005: C.F. Pachuca
 2005–2008: Club Deportivo Cruz Azul
 2008–2012: Cruz Azul Hidalgo

External links

1974 births
Living people
2002 FIFA World Cup players
Association football defenders
C.F. Monterrey players
C.F. Pachuca players
Club Universidad Nacional footballers
Cruz Azul footballers
Liga MX players
Mexican footballers
Mexico international footballers